Nancy Chard (July 14, 1933 – February 18, 2010) was an American politician who served in the Vermont House of Representatives from the Windham 2-3 district from 1991 to 1995 and in the Vermont Senate from the Windham district from 1995 to 2003.

She died on February 18, 2010, in Townshend, Vermont at age 76.

References

1933 births
2010 deaths
Democratic Party members of the Vermont House of Representatives
Democratic Party Vermont state senators
People from Point Pleasant, New Jersey
Women state legislators in Vermont
21st-century American women